Emanuele Ferraro (born 8 September 1978) is an Italian football coach and former player.

Playing career

Early career
Born in Santa Teresa di Riva, Sicily, Ferraro started his career with Lombardy club Brescia. After a Serie D season with Ospitaletto, which 10 km away from province capital Brescia, he left for German Fußball-Regionalliga club Magdeburg and played his first match on 11 August 1999.

In mid-2000, Ferraro returned to Italy and played a season for Serie C2 club Gubbio. In the next season he left for Serie D team Grosseto. He finished as the group F runner-up and later admitted to Serie C2. In 2002–03 season, he scored a career high of 19 league goals for Serie D team Corigliano.

Ascoli
In June 2003, he was signed by Serie B team Ascoli. Ferraro was lack of chance to play and left for Serie C1 club Vis Pesaro in January 2004. In June 2004, he was signed by Serie C2 club Ancona. Once again he scored a double figure for the team and the whole team only scored 34 goals.

At the start of 2005–06 Serie A season, Ferraro returned to Ascoli Piceno and played twice in 2005–06 Coppa Italia. However, he was not in Ascoli's Serie A plan.

Salernitana
In the last day of 2005 summer transfer window, he was signed by Serie C1 club Salernitana Calcio 1919 along with Gaetano Vastola, which the club was newly found to replace the bankrupt Serie B team Salernitana Sport. However, he played less regularly in the next season and scored 7 goals with the Serie C1 champion. He was the second striker of the team, behind Arturo Di Napoli.

On 1 September 2008, he was loaned to fellow Serie B side Piacenza. With the Emilia side, he partnered with Davide Moscardelli in 442 formation or on the bench when the coach use 433 formation. He scored 7 league goals, which is the second best scorer behind Moscardelli (8 goals).

In 2009–10 Serie B season, Ferraro return to Salerno but only made 7 starts in Serie B.

Taranto
On 1 February 2010, he left the Serie B struggler and was signed by Lega Pro Prima Divisione team Taranto. In January 2011 he was loaned to Paganese.

Late career
In September 2011 he was signed by Serie D club A.C.R. Messina after he terminated his contract with Taranto.

Coaching career
After retirement, Ferraro took on a coaching career, and was at the helm of Serie D club Gelbison in 2013; he successively went on to become a youth coach for Salernitana and Cosenza, leaving the latter role in March 2021. On 14 October 2021, he took over as the head coach of FC Messina in the Serie D league, following a dismal start in the  season with four losses in five league games. He was released by FC Messina in December 2021 following the club's exclusion from the league.

Honours
Serie C1: 2008

References

External links
 
 
 Football.it Profile 
 La Gazzetta dello Sport Profile 

Italian footballers
Italian football managers
Italian expatriate footballers
Serie B players
Brescia Calcio players
1. FC Magdeburg players
A.S. Gubbio 1910 players
F.C. Grosseto S.S.D. players
Ascoli Calcio 1898 F.C. players
Vis Pesaro dal 1898 players
A.C. Ancona players
U.S. Salernitana 1919 players
Piacenza Calcio 1919 players
Taranto F.C. 1927 players
Association football forwards
Expatriate footballers in Germany
Italian expatriate sportspeople in Germany
Sportspeople from the Province of Messina
1978 births
Living people
Footballers from Sicily